Charles II (26 January 1555 – 17 May 1589) was Lord of Monaco from 7 October 1581 to 17 May 1589.

Charles was the eldest son of Honoré I (1522–1581) and Isabella Grimaldi (died 1583). He became Lord of Monaco on the death of his father in 1581.

Protected by Spain, due to the Treaties of 1524, Charles was the first Lord of Monaco who refused to pay homage to the Dukes of Savoy for Mentone and Roccabruna. In 1583 he was declared, after a trial, to have forfeited those two cities.

Charles ruled for only 8 years before dying at the age of 33. He left no issue and so his youngest brother Hercule became Lord of Monaco.

Ancestors

1555 births
1589 deaths
16th-century Lords of Monaco
House of Grimaldi
Lords of Monaco
Burials at the Cathedral of Our Lady Immaculate
People from Campagna
People of Ligurian descent